Yann Trégouët (born 25 January 1975, in Paris) is a French actor. He appeared in more than thirty films since 1993.

Selected filmography

External links 
 

1975 births
Living people
Male actors from Paris
French male film actors
French male television actors
French people of Breton descent